Chris McNally (born November 8, 1988), also known as Christopher McNally, is a Canadian-born actor most noted for his role as Lucas Bouchard in the Hallmark Channel series When Calls the Heart (2019–present).

Personal life
McNally was born in the Toronto suburb of Scarborough, Ontario. His family moved to North Vancouver when he was about 1 (according to Chris in an interview with Paul Greene in June 2021.) He grew up and attended Argyle Secondary School in North Vancouver, where he trained at Railtown Actors Studio following high school graduation. McNally is not married, but claims he is "...quite at home wherever [my] dogs are..." He now splits his time between Los Angeles and Vancouver as necessary.

McNally is the cousin of actor and singer Drew Seeley.

On June 5, 2022, it was announced via Julie Gonzalo’s Instagram that she and Chris welcomed their first child.

Career
McNally's film career began with his award-winning portrayal of John Jardine in 2013's John Apple Jack.  In 2017 he appeared in Freefall.

Episodic television work includes appearances in The CW's Supernatural and TNT's original series Falling Skies.  He appeared in several episodes of the NetFlix original series Altered Carbon (2018).  He became a TV series regular with his portrayal of character Lucas Bouchard starting in early 2019 in the Hallmark Channel's popular series When Calls the Heart.

In mid-2019, McNally portrayed Cal Dennison in the Lifetime Network TV movie adaptation of VC Andrews' novel, Heaven.

McNally is an actor and writer. He is a member of the Hallmark stable of wholesome talent, with appearances in several holiday productions distributed by Hallmark Movies & Mysteries, such as Hearts of Christmas (2016); Rocky Mountain Christmas (2017); The Sweetest Heart (2018); and A Winter Princess (2019).

Work

Filmography
 Freefall; (2017 short film); Lucas
 The Orchard; (2016); Andy Cunningham
 John Apple Jack; (2013); John Jardine
 The Plastic Protocol; (2010 short film); Sebastian St. Paul
 Another Cinderella Story; (2008); Fan at the Competition (uncredited)

TV
 A Tail of Love; 2022 Hallmark made-for-TV movie; JR Stockard
 Riverdale (2017 TV series); 2021; Alan Mayberry; 1 episode
 Snowkissed; 2021 Hallmark made-for-TV movie; Noah
 V.C. Andrews' Heaven; 2019; Cal Dennison
 Sailing Into Love; 2019 Hallmark made-for-TV movie; Tom
 When Calls the Heart 2019 – present; Lucas Bouchard – main character
 A Winter Princess; 2019; Hallmark made-for-TV movie; Jesse
 The Sweetest Heart; 2018 Hallmark made-for-TV movie; Nate
 Altered Carbon (2018); Sergei Brevlov; 3 episodes
 Same Time Next Week; 2017 Hallmark made-for-TV movie; Teddy
 Eat, Drink, & Be Buried: A Gourmet Detective Mystery; (2017); Douglas Weston
 Rocky Mountain Christmas; 2017; Hallmark made-for-TV movie; Cody McKinney
 Hearts of Christmas; 2016; Hallmark made-for-TV movie; Conner
 Dead of Summer; 2016; Hipster Guy
 Falling Skies; 2015; Ryan; 1 episode
 Supernatural 2009–2015; Unnamed Busboy (episode "Death Takes a Holiday", 2009) and Ty (episode "Inside Man", 2015)
 Untold Stories of the E.R. 2012; Dave
 Tower Prep 2010; West Campus Security Monitor #1
 Killer Instinct 2005; Ice Cream Clerk

Awards
McNally received the 2014 award for "Best Actor in a Feature Film" at "FilmOut San Diego" for John Apple Jack.

Notes

External links
 

1988 births
21st-century Canadian male actors
Male actors from British Columbia
People from North Vancouver
Canadian male television actors
Canadian male film actors
Living people